Michael Te Rakato Parekōwhai (born 1968) is a New Zealand sculptor and a professor at the University of Auckland's Elam School of Fine Arts. He is of Ngāriki Rotoawe and Ngāti Whakarongo descent and his mother is Pākehā.

Parekowhai was awarded an Arts Foundation of New Zealand Laureate Award in 2001. He represented New Zealand at the 2011 Venice Biennale.

Early life 
Parekowhai was born in Porirua. Both his parents were schoolteachers. He spent his childhood in Auckland's North Shore suburbs, where he also attended school. After leaving high school, Parekowhai worked as a florist's assistant before commencing a bachelor's degree in fine arts at University of Auckland's Elam School of Fine Arts (1987–1990). He trained as a high-school art teacher before returning to Elam to complete a maser's degree in fine arts (1998–2000).

Themes and style 
Parekowhai makes a variety of work across a range of media that intersects sculpture and photography. Sally Blundell, writing in the New Zealand Listener, says:

Originality, authenticity, ownership. In Parekowhai’s work, such notions blur, slipping into a collective act of translation that interweaves the canon of "high art" with cultural tradition, the handmade object with mass-produced tourist tat, the imported with the proudly colloquial.

Despite the range of Parekowhai's output, his practice is linked throughout, both stylistically—a characteristic 'gloss' of high production value—and thematically.

Curator Justin Paton writes that Parekowhai's works "have a way of sneaking up on you, even when they're straight ahead." He continues:

Pick-up sticks swollen to the size of spears. A photograph of a stuffed rabbit who has you in his sights. A silky bouquet that rustles with politics. Seemingly serene beneath their gleaming, factory-finished surfaces, Michael Parekowhai's sculptures and photographs are in fact supremely artful objects. 'Artful' not just because they're beautifully made...but also because they manage, with a combination of slyness, charm and audacity, to spring ambushes that leave you richer.

Notable works 

On First Looking into Chapman's Homer – an installation of two bronze bulls on grand pianos, two bronze olive saplings and the figure of a stoic security guard, his entry in 54th La Biennale di Venezia in 2011. Part of this installation, titled Chapman's Homer and consisting of a single bull atop a piano, was acquired by the Christchurch Art Gallery.
A Peak in Darien – a bronze bull atop a grand piano. The piece sold at an auction in New Zealand for $2,051,900 in November 2021, becoming the most expensive artwork by any artist sold in a New Zealand auction.

 The World Turns – a life-sized bronze elephant tipped on its head and eye-to-eye with a kuril (water-rat), commissioned by the Queensland Gallery of Modern Art.
 He Kōrero Pūrākau mo Te Awanui o Te Motu: story of a New Zealand river — an original Steinway grand piano covered in glossy red carvings. The piano is played at each of the exhibitions that it features in, for example in the 2012 Te Papa exhibition with works from Colin McCahon and Jim Allen.
 The Lighthouse: Tū Whenua-a-Kura – Queens Wharf, Auckland

Exhibitions

Solo 
 2016 "The Tongue of The Dog, outside Waikato Museum, Hamilton, New Zealand
 2015 The Promised Land Queensland Art Gallery and Gallery of Modern Art (QAGOMA), Brisbane, Australia.
 2013 The Past in the Present, Michael Lett at the Auckland Art Fair, Auckland
 2012 On First Looking into Chapman's Homer, Christchurch Art Gallery Te Puna o Waiwhetu, Christchurch.
 2011 54th Venice Biennale New Zealand Pavilion. Also at Musée du Quai Branly, Paris, France
 2011 The Far Side Michael Lett, Auckland
 2011 Te Ao Hurihuri Jonathan Smart Gallery, Christchurch
 2009 The Moment of Cubism Michael Lett, Auckland, New Zealand
 2009 Seldom is Herd, Roslyn Oxley Gallery, Sydney, Australia
 2009 Yes We Are One Day Sculpture, Wellington, New Zealand
 2008 Jim McMurtry Maori Hall / Michael Lett, Auckland, New Zealand
 2007 The Song of the Frog, Michael Lett, Auckland, New Zealand
 2007 My Sister, My Self Michael Lett, Auckland, New Zealand
 1994 Kiss the Baby Goodbye Govett-Brewster, New Plymouth.
 1994 A Capella, Greg Flint Gallery, Auckland

 Group 
 1990 Choice! Artspace, Auckland
 1992 Headlands Museum of Contemporary Art, Sydney
 1995–1996 Cultural Safety City Gallery Wellington and Frankfurter Kunstverein
 2004 'Paradise Now? Contemporary Art from the Pacific at Asia Society & Museum New York, NY
 Asia Pacific Triennial of Contemporary Art, Brisbane, Australia (APT3 1999, APT5 2006 & APT7 2012)
 2014–2015 Black Rainbow, Te Papa, Wellington

Collections
Parekowhai's work is held in most New Zealand public gallery collections and a number of international museums, including the Queensland Art Gallery | Gallery of Modern Art, Brisbane, Australia.

 Awards / honours 
 Artist Laureate, Arts Foundation of New Zealand, 2001.
 Premier of Queensland Sculpture Commission, Queensland, Australia, 2011.
 Nga Toa Whakaihuwaka, Māori of the Year for Arts, 2011.
Barfoot & Thompson, 90th Anniversary Gift to Auckland City, Waterfront Commission, 2013.
 'Top 50 Public Art Project' awarded by Americans for the Arts, Public Art Network, 2013 Year in Review, for Blue Stratus, Phoenix Sky Harbor International Airport, Arizona, USA, 2013.  In collaboration with Mario Madayag.
 Fellow of the Royal Society Te Apārangi, 2017.

 See also 
List of public art in Brisbane

 Notes 

 References 

Further reading
 Maud Page et al., Michael Parekowhai : the promised land, Brisbane: Queensland Art Gallery, 2015. 
 Mary Barr (ed), On first looking into Chapman's Homer : New Zealand at the 54th Biennale di Venezia 2011, Auckland: Michael Lett and Roslyn Oxley Gallery, 2011. 
 Michael Lett and Ryan Moore (eds), Michael Parekowhai, Auckland: Michael Lett, 2007. 
 Margery King and Ngahiraka Mason, Michael Parekowhai: Ten Guitars, Pittsburgh: Andy Warhol Museum, 2001.
 Robert Leonard, Michael Parekowhai: Ten Guitars, Auckland: Artspace, 1999. 
 Robert Leonard and Lara Strongman, Michael Parekowhai: Kiss the baby goodbye, New Plymouth: Govett-Brewster Art Gallery, 1994. 

 External links 

 Staff profile, University of Auckland
 Artist biography, Artfacts.net
 Michael Parekowhai page on the Bowerbank Ninow artist database
 Artist biography on Ocula website
 Radio New Zealand National interview, 12 March 2011 
 CV on Michael Lett website
 Works in the Auckland Art Gallery Toi o Tāmaki collection
 Works in the Chartwell Collection
 Works in the Christchurch Art Gallery collection
 Works in the Dunedin Public Art Gallery collection
 Works in the Museum of New Zealand Te Papa Tongarewa collection
 Works in the Queensland Art Gallery collection
 Bernard Osman 'Cost of State House sculpture rocketed to $1.9 million' New Zealand Herald, 23 October 2014
 John McDonald 'Review: Michael Parekowhai's Promised Land delivers plenty' Sydney Morning Herald, 5 June 2015
 Charlie Gates, The bull comes home, The Press'', 11 January 2016. Interview with the artist.
 PUBLIC ART NETWORK YEAR IN REVIEW DATABASE, https://www.americansforthearts.org/by-program/networks-and-councils/public-art-network/public-art-year-in-review-database/blue-stratus

1968 births
New Zealand contemporary artists
Elam Art School alumni
Living people
New Zealand Māori artists
20th-century New Zealand sculptors
20th-century New Zealand male artists
21st-century New Zealand sculptors
21st-century New Zealand male artists
People associated with the Museum of New Zealand Te Papa Tongarewa
Ngāriki Kaiputahi
Academic staff of the University of Auckland